Amy Laura Bondurant (born April 20, 1951) is an American attorney who served as U.S. Ambassador to the Organization for Economic Cooperation and Development (OECD) from 1997 to 2001. Bondurant was the first woman to represent the United States at the OECD and was also the first woman to serve on the board of Rolls-Royce.

Early life and education 
Born in Union City, Tennessee, Bondurant grew up in Hickman, Kentucky. Her father was Judge John C. Bondurant and her mother was Doris Bondurant. Bondurant attended the University of Kentucky, where she received her bachelor's degree in telecommunications in 1973 In 1978, Bondurant received her Juris Doctor degree from Washington College of Law of the American University.

Career

Staffing and legal career 
Bondurant began her career as a legislative assistant for Senator Wendell Ford. As the ranking member of the Senate Commerce Committee, Ford pushed for the nomination of Bondurant to serve on the Federal Trade Commission (FTC) in 1982, though this position went to George W. Douglas instead.

Bondurant later became a partner and board member of the law firm Verner, Liipfert, Bernhard, McPherson and Hand. Bondurant was the first female member of the firm's board of directors and executive committee.

Federal government career 
In 1993, Secretary of Transportation Federico Peña appointed Bondurant to serve as chairwoman of the Commercial Space Transportation Advisory Committee. Bondurant served in this capacity until 1997, when she was appointed by President Bill Clinton as U.S. Representative to the Organization for Economic Cooperation and Development (OECD).

Post-government career 
In 2007, Bondurant endorsed Senator Hillary Clinton's 2008 presidential campaign, alongside over a hundred Clinton Administration alumni. Bondurant remained active in the foreign policy sphere, joining the Council on Foreign Relations and speaking out in support of Clinton's plan to defeat ISIS during the 2016 campaign.

Personal life 
Bondurant is married to David E. Dunn III, an attorney with the Washington, D.C.-based firm Squire Patton Boggs LLP. They have one son.

References 

1951 births
Living people
Ambassadors of the United States to the Organisation for Economic Co-operation and Development
American women ambassadors
Ambassadors of the United States
People from Kentucky
University of Kentucky alumni
Washington College of Law alumni
21st-century American women